The following lists events that happened during 1967 in Australia.

Incumbents

 Monarch – Elizabeth II
 Governor-General – Lord Casey
 Prime Minister –  Harold Holt (until 17 December), then John McEwen (from 19 December)
Opposition Leader – Arthur Calwell (until 9 February), then Gough Whitlam
 Chief Justice – Sir Garfield Barwick

State and Territory Leaders
 Premier of New South Wales – Robert Askin
Opposition Leader – Jack Renshaw
 Premier of Queensland – Frank Nicklin
Opposition Leader – Jack Houston
 Premier of South Australia – Frank Walsh (until 1 June), then Don Dunstan
Opposition Leader – Steele Hall
 Premier of Tasmania – Eric Reece
Opposition Leader – Angus Bethune
 Premier of Victoria – Sir Henry Bolte
Opposition Leader – Clive Stoneham (until 15 May), then Clyde Holding
 Premier of Western Australia – David Brand
Opposition Leader – John Tonkin

Governors and Administrators
 Governor of New South Wales – Sir Roden Cutler
 Governor of Queensland – Sir Alan Mansfield
 Governor of South Australia – Lieutenant General Sir Edric Bastyan
 Governor of Tasmania – General Sir Charles Gairdner
 Governor of Victoria – Major General Sir Rohan Delacombe
 Governor of Western Australia – Major General Sir Douglas Kendrew
 Administrator of Nauru – Leslie King
 Administrator of Norfolk Island – Reginald Marsh
 Administrator of the Northern Territory – Roger Dean
 Administrator of Papua and New Guinea – David Hay (from 9 January)

Events

January
18 January – The Prime Minister of South Vietnam Nguyen Cao Ky begins a controversial visit to Australia. He is welcomed by supporters of South Vietnam but is then constantly heckled by anti-war protesters, and Harold Holt is forced to deny that Ky and his supporters are corrupt and were responsible for murdering his predecessor, President Ngo Dinh Diem.

February
First student intake at Macquarie University.
3 February – Ronald Ryan becomes the last man hanged in Australia; he was executed for the murder of prison warder George Hodson while escaping from Pentridge Prison on 19 December 1965.
7 February – Black Tuesday in Tasmania – massive bushfires devastate much of the Tasmanian capital of Hobart and surrounding areas.
8 February – Gough Whitlam defeats Dr Jim Cairns and Frank Crean to replace the retiring Arthur Calwell as leader of the federal Australian Labor Party.

March
1 March – The Royal Australian Navy replaces the British White Ensign flag on all its ships with the Australian White Ensign.
1 March – The Duke of Edinburgh visits Australia.
8 March – La Trobe University is officially opened.
13 March – Bessie Rischbieth protested against the Mounts Bay reclamation project on the Swan River and the building of the Narrows Bridge and dies.

April
4 April – The Australian government announces it will not ban the oral contraceptive pill, maintaining that the risk of thrombosis is "very slight".
7 April – Australian military adviser Major Peter Badcoe is killed in action in Vietnam during an operation in Hương Trà District with the 1st ARVN Division Reaction Company.
12 April – Australian Roman Catholic bishops publicly declare their opposition to the war in Vietnam.
29 April – A majority in the New England region of New South Wales voted against the creation of a new state in the referendum.

May
25 May – The report by the Tasmanian Hydro Electric Commission on the Gordon Power scheme was tabled in parliament and the Government of Tasmania sought approval for $100 million funding.
27 May – Indigenous Australians (technically only the Aboriginal race – see Australian referendum, 1967 (Aboriginals)) are given the right to be counted in the national census after a national referendum and legislation changing citizenship laws, but voters reject a third referendum question about breaking the nexus between the sizes of the Senate and the House of Representatives.
29 May – The new Australian 5-dollar note goes into circulation.

June
1 June – Don Dunstan succeeds Frank Walsh as Premier of South Australia, after Walsh retires under pressure from his party.
7 June – Launceston, Tasmania, records the highest barometric pressure on record for Australia with a reading of 1044.3 millibars or 30.84 inHg.
25 June – Sydney underworld figure Richard Gabriel Reilly is murdered.
29 June – The Tasmanian Government passes a Bill revoking the national park status of Lake Pedder, allowing the Hydro Electric Commission to construct a dam flooding the lake.

July
1 July – The postcode system of postal address coding is introduced throughout Australia.

August
1 August – Qantas Airways drops the word 'Empire' from its name.

September
9 September – Proposed changes to Queensland laws governing public demonstrations results in 3,500 people protesting in the streets of Brisbane. Queensland Police arrest 114 people.
16 September – The U.S. Naval Communication Station North West Cape near Exmouth, Western Australia is declared operational.
28 September – amendments to the South Australian Licensing Act came into effect ending the era of the Six o'clock swill in Australia

October
1 October – The NSW National Parks & Wildlife Service is established.
20 October – Australia unlinks the Australian dollar from British currency, when the British government makes a decision to devalue the pound sterling.

November
27 November – Singer John Farnham, then known as Johnny Farnham, releases Sadie (The Cleaning Lady). It was his first Number 1.

December
14 December – South Australia's Simpson Desert Conservation Park and Queensland's Simpson Desert National Park are proclaimed.
17 December – Prime Minister Harold Holt disappears while swimming in heavy surf at Cheviot Beach, near Portsea, Victoria.
19 December – Following the disappearance and presumed death of Holt, Country Party leader John McEwen is sworn in as interim Prime Minister pending the election of a new government leader by the Coalition parties.
20 December – John McEwen announced he will not serve in a government led by Liberal Party deputy leader William McMahon, Harold Holt's presumed successor, triggering a leadership crisis for the Coalition.

Unknown and general dates
 General Motors Holden exports its 100,000th car and launches its first compact sedan, the Torana.
 Sydney is rocked by a series of brutal underworld killings as rival gangs battle for control of the city's lucrative gambling and prostitution rackets
 Bomber aircraft from No. 2 Squadron RAAF Canberra are deployed to Phan Rang airbase in South Vietnam
 Federal Cabinet decides to drop the word 'British' from the cover of Australian passports, and agrees that it will have to amend the Nationality and Citizenship Act to change the designation 'British subject' on the inside of passports.
 Australia Square Tower, Australia's first true skyscraper, is completed.
In an exceptionally dry year across Victoria, South Australia and southwestern New South Wales, Melbourne records only  and Adelaide only , in both cases this being the driest year on record by a substantial margin.
Acquisition of Land Act 1967 is passed by the Parliament of Queensland

Science and technology
17 March – Honeysuckle Creek Tracking Station is opened near Canberra.
April – Dung beetles released between Broome, Western Australia and Townsville, Queensland in the Australian Dung Beetle Project, led by Dr. George Bornemissza of the CSIRO in an attempt to control the buffalo fly.
1 May – Health authorities begin the first national polio immunisation campaign using the new Sabin oral vaccine developed by Dr Jonas Salk.
29 November – Australia's first satellite, WRESAT, is launched on an American Redstone rocket from Woomera, South Australia.

Culture

Arts and literature

 26 July – The Groop wins Hoadley's Battle of the Sounds
 30 July – Melbourne's La Mama Theatre opens.
 1 November – National Gallery of Australia established by the Commonwealth Government with an announcement by prime minister Harold Holt that the Government would construct the building
 November – The song "Sadie (The Cleaning Lady)" sung by Johnny Farnham is released.
 December – National Gallery of Victoria building designed by Roy Grounds opens
 Thomas Keneally's novel Bring Larks and Heroes wins the Miles Franklin Award
 Joan Lindsay's Picnic at Hanging Rock is published
 Judy Cassab's portrait of Margo Lewers wins the Archibald Prize
 Museum of the Riverina established in Wagga Wagga, New South Wales
 Christina Stead's Cotters' England published
 John Brack's Nude With Dressing Gown is painted

Film

 Interaction: Moving and Painting (dir. Gil Brealy) wins the AFI Award for Best Film
 Journey Out of Darkness (dir. James Trainor)
 The Pudding Thieves (dir. Brian Davies)
 Robbery (dir. Peter Yates)
 Shades Of Puffing Billy (dir. Antonio Colacino)
 Wheels Across A Wilderness (dir. Malcolm Leyland)
 Forgotten Cinema (dir. Anthony Buckley), the influential documentary about the rise and fall of the Australian feature film industry

Television
10 April – The ninth Logie Awards are held on board the TSS Fairstar cruise ship. Graham Kennedy wins his third Gold Logie.
10 April – This Day Tonight, Australia's first national nightly TV current affairs program, premieres on ABC-TV, hosted by Bill Peach.
25 June – The ABC participates in the historic Our World broadcast, the world's first live, international, satellite television production.
5 July – The Seven Network premieres a new situation comedy series My Name's McGooley, What's Yours? starring Gordon Chater, John Meillon and Judi Farr, and the Nine Network premiered the spy drama Hunter, starring Tony Ward.
15 June – ATV0 broadcasts the first colour television program in Australia when it televises the horse racing from Pakenham, Victoria.
28 August – The popular ABC soap opera Bellbird begins its ten-year run.
11 September – The children's television show Adventure Island begins airing on the ABC.
16 September – The first live telecast of a football grand final in Australia was the screening of the 1967 NSWRFL season's grand final between Canterbury-Bankstown and South Sydney at the Sydney Cricket Ground.

Sport

Athletics (track and field)
27 March – Bill Howard from Wodonga won the Stawell Gift starting from 5 yards in a time of 11.6 seconds
28 June – Judy Pollock breaks Ann Packer's world record (2:04.3) in the women's 800 metres, clocking 2:01.0 at a meet in Helsinki, Finland.
9 September – Derek Clayton wins his first men's national marathon title, clocking 2:21:58 in Adelaide.

Australian rules football
23 September – Richmond defeats Geelong 16.18 (114) to 15.15 (105) in front of 109,396 people to win the 1967 Victorian Football League Grand Final
 Ross Smith of St Kilda wins the 1967 Brownlow Medal
 Sturt Football Club won the 1967 South Australian National Football League grand final, defeating Port Adelaide 13.10 (88) to 10.17 (77)
 Perth defeats East Perth 18.12 (120) to 15.12 (102) in front of 42,625 people to win the Western Australian National Football League grand final
North Hobart wins the Tasmanian National Football League, defeating Glenorchy 11.12 (78) to 8.16 (64)

Cricket
The Australian cricket team, captained by Bob Simpson toured South Africa in 1966–67, losing the Test series 3–1
 Victoria win the 1966–67 Sheffield Shield

Golf
 Peter Thomson won the Australian Open
 Peter Thomson won the Australian PGA Championship, played at the Metropolitan Golf Club in Melbourne

Motor racing
 Jack Brabham was named 1966 Australian Man of the Year and the Queen awarded him Order of the British Empire
 Jackie Stewart driving for the British Racing Motors team won the Australian Grand Prix held at Warwick Farm Racecourse
 Harry Firth and Fred Gibson won the Bathurst 500 driving a Ford XR Falcon GT.  This was Firth's fourth Bathurst victory

Rugby league
16 September – South Sydney defeats Canterbury Bankstown 12–10 in front of 56,358 people to win the 1967 New South Wales Rugby League Grand Final.
The Penrith Panthers and the Cronulla-Sutherland Sharks are introduced into the New South Wales Rugby League competition.
 The newly-founded Cronulla-Sutherland team finish in last position in the New South Wales Rugby League competition, claiming the wooden spoon.
 Brothers defeats Northern Suburbs 6–2 to win the 1967 Brisbane Rugby League premiership.

Rugby union
The All Blacks defeat Australia 29–9 to retain the Bledisloe Cup.

Squash 
The first Squash racquets international championship is held and won by Australia.

Tennis
8 July – John Newcombe wins the men's singles at Wimbledon, defeating Germany's Wilhelm Bungert 6–3 6–1 6–1.
10 September – John Newcombe wins the men's singles at the US Open, defeating the USA's Clark Graebner 6–4 6–4 8–6.
 Roy Emerson defeats Arthur Ashe 6–4 6–1 6–4 in the men's singles final at the Australian Open.
 Nancy Gunter defeats Lesley Turner Bowrey 6–1, 6–4 in the women's singles final at the Australian Open.

Yachting
18 November – Dame Pattie, Australian challenger for the America's Cup was defeated by the American defender Intrepid which won the series 4–0.
30 December – Pen Duick III (France) won line honours in the 1967 Sydney to Hobart Yacht Race in a time of 4:04:10:31. Rainbow II (New Zealand) is the overall winner.

Other
 3 March – The Duke of Edinburgh laid a foundation stone for a new Western Stand at the Melbourne Cricket Ground, which was completed in 1968 (known as the Ponsford Stand after 1986).
 7 November – Red Handed, ridden by Roy Higgins and trained by Bart Cummings wins the 1967 Melbourne Cup in a time of 3:20:40.
 14 November - Australia wins the men's association football South Vietnam Independence Cup in Saigon in the final against South Korea.
 The Manchester United football team tours Australia.

Births
 4 January – David Wilson, rugby player
 7 January – Ricky Stuart, rugby player, coach, and sportscaster
 8 January – Steven Jacobs, television host and actor
 13 January – Annie Jones, actress
 3 February – Aurelio Vidmar, soccer player
 3 April – Mark Skaife, racing driver
 9 April – Graeme Lloyd, baseball player
 11 April – Lachlan Dreher, field hockey goalkeeper
 17 April – Barnaby Joyce, politician
 23 April – Rob Pyne, politician
 2 May – Rob J. Hyndman, statistician
 2 May – Kerryn McCann, athlete
 5 May – Danny Kah, ice speed skater
 7 May – Martin Bryant, perpetrator of the Port Arthur massacre
 14 May – Shaun Creighton, long-distance runner
 15 May – James Bradley, author
 20 May – Aaron Harper, politician
 29 May – Jim McDonald, politician
 30 May – Rechelle Hawkes, field hockey player
 31 May – Stephen Silvagni, Aussie rules footballer
 20 June – Nicole Kidman, American-born actress
 24 June – Tracey Belbin, field hockey player and coach
 3 July
 Tony Briggs, actor, writer and producer 
 Michael Bruce McKenzie, freestyle swimmer
 5 July – Robert J. Kral, composer
 12 July – Martin Lynes, actor
 17 July – Peter Lonard, golfer
 30 July – Victor Dominello, politician
 9 August – Lars Kleppich, sailor
 8 September – James Packer, businessman
 4 October – Nick Green, rower
 5 October – Guy Pearce, actor
 13 October – David Gibson, politician
 26 October – Keith Urban, New Zealand-born country music singer
 28 October – Mark Taylor, politician
 1 November – Tina Arena, singer
 29 November – Sean Carlin, hammer thrower
 16 December – Miranda Otto, actress
 22 December – Paul Morris, racing driver and businessman
 28 December – Paul Foster, football (soccer) player

Undated
Mark Salmon, surf lifesaver

Deaths
 4 January – Ezra Norton (born 1897), newspaper proprietor
 22 January – James Alexander Allan (born 1879), poet
 3 February
 Ronald Ryan (born 1925), last person hanged in Australia
 Eric Edgley (born 1899), theatre performer and impresario
 7 February – David Unaipon (born 1872), Aboriginal author and inventor
 9 February – Fred Hoysted (born 1883), racehorse trainer
 13 March – Bessie Rischbieth (born 1874), feminist and social activist
 14 March – Ernest Henry Burgmann (born 1885), Anglican bishop and social critic
 29 March – D'Arcy Niland (born 1917), author of The Shiralee
 7 April – Peter Badcoe (born 1934), soldier and Victoria Cross winner
 24 April – Robert Richards (born 1885), Premier of South Australia
 24 April – Eric Baume (born 1900), journalist, author and broadcaster – first "beast" on the talk show Beauty and the Beast
 13 May – Lance Sharkey (born 1898), Communist activist
 15 May – Jessie Traill (born 1881), artist
 13 June – Gerald Patterson (born 1895), tennis player
 18 June – Clive Latham Baillieu, 1st Baron Baillieu (born 1889), Businessman and public servant
 2 July – Ivo Whitton (born 1893), golfer
 4 July – Ray Parer (born 1894), aviator
 6 July – Joseph Maxwell (born 1896), soldier and Victoria Cross winner
 26 July – Robert Tudawali (b. c1929), Indigenous actor
 30 July – Arthur Stace (born 1885), pavement scribe known as Mr Eternity
 15 August – Dave McNamara (born 1887), Australian rules footballer
 25 August – Stanley Bruce (born 1883), eighth Prime Minister of Australia
 25 August – Robert George (born 1896), Governor of South Australia
 13 October – Kerr Grant (born 1878), physicist and education administrator
 3 November – Justin Simonds (born 1890), Roman Catholic Archbishop of Melbourne
 13 November – Helen Mayo (born 1878), pioneer in women's and children's health
 16 November – Ernest Durack (born 1882), New South Welsh politician
 17 December – Harold Holt (born 1908), seventeenth Prime Minister of Australia
 29 December – Eric Woodward (born 1899), Governor of New South Wales
 31 December – Arthur Mailey (born 1886), cricketer

See also 
 List of Australian films of the 1960s

References 

 
Australia
Years of the 20th century in Australia